Martha Jackman  is a professor of law at the University of Ottawa Faculty of Law. Her scholarship focuses on constitutional law.

Jackman received her JD from the University of Toronto Faculty of Law and an LLM from Yale Law School. In 2012, she delivered testimony to a committee of the Senate of Canada on the Charter implications of proposed amendments to the Criminal Code. She has been a member of the national steering committee of the National Association of Women and the Law since 2007.

Jackman was elected a Fellow of the Royal Society of Canada in 2017 and received the David Walter Mundell Medal from the government of Ontario in 2018 in recognition of her legal writing.

References

External links 

 Faculty profile at the University of Ottawa Faculty of Law
 

Academic staff of the University of Ottawa
Fellows of the Royal Society of Canada
University of Toronto Faculty of Law alumni
Yale Law School alumni
Canadian scholars of constitutional law
Year of birth missing (living people)
Living people